Merrick Brett (born 14 February 2001) is a South African cricketer. He made his first-class debut on 26 March 2021, for Northerns in the 2020–21 CSA 3-Day Provincial Cup. Prior to his first-class debut, he was named in South Africa's squad for the 2020 Under-19 Cricket World Cup.

References

External links
 

2001 births
Living people
South African cricketers
Northerns cricketers
Place of birth missing (living people)